is a former Japanese former football player.

Career
Signed by Avispa Fukuoka after playing as a student at Fukuoka University, he was declared J2 Rookie of the Year in his first season at the club. Sueyoshi retired at the end of the 2019 season.

Club statistics
Updated to 23 February 2020.

References

External links
Profile at Avispa Fukuoka

1987 births
Living people
Fukuoka University alumni
Association football people from Fukuoka Prefecture
Japanese footballers
J1 League players
J2 League players
J3 League players
Avispa Fukuoka players
Sagan Tosu players
Oita Trinita players
Fagiano Okayama players
SC Sagamihara players
Association football midfielders